Wildavsky is a surname. Notable people with the surname include:
 Aaron Wildavsky (1930–1993), American political scientist
 Adam Wildavsky (born 1960), American bridge player